Vin Taylor (1896–1961) was an American set designer  active in American cinema and television from the 1930s to the 1960s.

Selected filmography

 Kentucky Blue Streak (1935)
 Skybound (1935)
 Suicide Squad (1935)
 Rip Roaring Riley (1935)
 The Reckless Way (1936)
 Special Agent K-7 (1936)
 I'll Name the Murderer (1936)
 A Million to One (1937)
 Two Gun Man from Harlem (1938)
 California Frontier (1938)
 The Duke Is Tops (1938)
 Life Goes On (1938)
 Code of the Fearless (1939)
 The Bronze Buckaroo (1939)
 The Utah Kid (1944)
 Marked Trails (1944)
 The Strange Mr. Gregory (1945)
 The Jade Mask (1945)
 Sensation Hunters (1945)
 Riders of the Dawn (1945)
 South of Monterey (1946)
 Beauty and the Bandit (1946)
 Stars Over Texas (1946)
 Moon Over Montana (1946)
 Song of the Sierras (1946)
 Riding the California Trail (1947)
 Six-Gun Serenade (1947)
 King of the Bandits (1947)
 The Law Comes to Gunsight (1947)
 Yankee Fakir (1947)
 Cowboy Cavalier (1948)
 Oklahoma Blues (1948)
 Panhandle (1948)
 Song of the Drifter (1948)
 Courtin' Trouble (1948)
 Outlaw Brand (1948)
 Range Renegades (1948)
 Partners of the Sunset (1948)
 The Rangers Ride (1948)
 Albuquerque (1948)
 Frontier Agent (1948)
 The Fighting Ranger (1948)
 Hidden Danger (1948)
 Crashing Thru (1949)
 Law of the West (1949)
 Roaring Westward (1949)
 Shadows of the West (1949)
 The Fighting Redhead (1949)
 Range Justice (1949)
 Brand of Fear (1949)
 Stampede (1949)
 Across the Rio Grande (1949)
 Cowboy and the Prizefighter (1949)
 Roll, Thunder, Roll! (1949)
 Ride, Ryder, Ride! (1949)
 Fence Riders (1950)
 Short Grass (1950)
 Law of the Panhandle (1950)
 The Return of Jesse James (1950)
 The Bandit Queen (1950)
 Cattle Queen (1951)
 The Lion Hunters (1951)
 Elephant Stampede (1951)
 Texas Lawmen (1951)
 The Longhorn (1951)
 The Girl on the Bridge (1951)
 The Steel Fist (1952)
 Sea Tiger (1952)
 The Great Jesse James Raid (1953)
 Secret of Outlaw Flats (1953)
 The Desperado (1954)
 Bitter Creek (1954)
 The Forty-Niners (1954)
 Two Guns and a Badge (1954)
 The Quiet Gun (1957)

References

Bibliography
 Marshall, Wendy L. William Beaudine: From Silents to Television. Scarecrow Press, 2005.
 Renzi, Thomas C. ''Cornell Woolrich from Pulp Noir to Film Noir. McFarland, 2015.

External links

1896 births
1961 deaths
American art directors
People from  Marshall, Illinois